This is a list of number-one hit singles in 1973 in New Zealand, starting with the first chart dated, 2 February 1973.

Chart

External links
 The Official NZ Music Chart, RIANZ website

1973 in New Zealand
1973 record charts
1973
1970s in New Zealand music